Michelle Weber (born 28 September 1996) is a South African swimmer. She competed in the women's marathon 10 kilometre event at the 2016 Summer Olympics. She finished 18th with a time of 1:59:05.0.

In 2019, she competed in the women's 5 km and women's 10 km events at the 2019 World Aquatics Championships held in Gwangju, South Korea. In the 5 km event she finished in 32nd place and in the 10 km event she finished in 31st place.

In June 2021, she qualified to represent South Africa at the 2020 Summer Olympics.

On 24 August 2022, she broke the South African ladies' record for swimming across the English Channel, which she did in a time of 10 hours and 21 minutes, shaving 8 minutes off of the previous record, held by Jeanne Pearson.

References

External links
 

1996 births
Living people
South African female long-distance swimmers
Olympic swimmers of South Africa
Swimmers at the 2016 Summer Olympics
Swimmers at the 2014 Summer Youth Olympics